Raise Your Fist in the Air is an EP by German hard rock and heavy metal artist Doro. It was released through Nuclear Blast on  3 August 2012.

Track listing

Vinyl track listing

Personnel
Band members
 Doro – vocals
 Bas Maas – guitars
 Luca Princiotta – guitars, keyboards
 Nick Douglas – bass
 Johnny Dee – drums

Technical personnel
 Geoffrey Gillespie – cover art

References

Doro (musician) EPs
2012 EPs
Nuclear Blast EPs